Galena Creek is a stream in the U.S. state of South Dakota.

Galena Creek was so named on account of valuable deposits of galena ore.

See also
List of rivers of South Dakota

References

Rivers of Custer County, South Dakota
Rivers of South Dakota